Broken River may refer to:

Australia 

Broken River (Victoria), a tributary of the Goulburn River
Broken River (Queensland), a river in Eungella National Park noted as a location for viewing the platypus
Broken River, Queensland, a locality in the Mackay Region

New Zealand 

Broken River (New Zealand), a river
Broken River Ski Area, a club skifield in South Island
Cave Stream, also known as Broken River Cave